Milos Raonic was the defending champion, but chose not to participate this year.

Kei Nishikori won the title, defeating John Isner in the final, 4–6, 6–4, 6–4.

Seeds
All seeds receive a bye into the second round.

Draw

Finals

Top half

Section 1

Section 2

Bottom half

Section 3

Section 4

Qualifying

Seeds

Qualifiers

Lucky losers
  Ivan Dodig

Qualifying draw

First qualifier

Second qualifier

Third qualifier

Fourth qualifier

Fifth qualifier

Sixth qualifier

References
Main Draw
Qualifying Draw

2015 ATP World Tour